The Trinity Alps Wilderness is a  designated wilderness located in northern California, roughly between Eureka and Redding.  It is jointly administered by Shasta-Trinity, Klamath, and Six Rivers National Forests. About  are administered by the Bureau of Land Management. The wilderness is located in the Salmon and Scott Mountains, subranges of the Klamath Mountains region.  The high, granitic and ultramafic peaks of the eastern half of the wilderness area are known as the Trinity Alps.  Granite peaks at the core of the area are known as the White Trinities, reddish ultramafic peaks in the southeast are known as the Red Trinities, and the forested mountains in the western half of the wilderness are known as the Green Trinities.

Flora and fauna
The botanical diversity of the Trinity Alps is quite unique. The region has intrigued botanists for many years because of the predominance of the Sierran flora only  from the Pacific Ocean. Conifers common in the Sierra Nevada such as foxtail pines, lodgepole pines, western white pines, whitebark pines, ponderosa pines, red firs, and white firs are also common in the Alps alongside the endemic Brewer spruce.  Large wildfires swept through the western forests in recent years.

Wildlife species include American black bears, black-tailed deer, cougars, coyotes, and bobcats.  Bears are common in the wilderness, so use a bear bag or bear canister.

Geology
Glacial cirques dominate the high country. The highest point is Thompson Peak at 9,001 ft (2,744 m).

Recreation
The most popular entry points into the wilderness are from the Weaverville area around Trinity Lake or from Junction City. Additional routes are seasonally accessible by car from the north and west. The paved road north from Junction City leads to the Canyon Creek trail, the most popular trail in the wilderness. The longest trails take several days to complete. The Pacific Crest Trail traverses the Scott Mountains in the northeast portion of the wilderness.

Glacial cirques hold many small lakes stocked with trout and ponds frequented by newts.  Streams offer trout fishing, and tributaries to the lower Trinity River hold migratory steelhead and chinook salmon.  Hunting occurs in late summer and fall for deer, bear, and bandtailed pigeon.

Although some of the high lakes are popular in summer, most of the land is infrequently visited.  Many of the trails are in poor condition and hard to follow, so skills with map and compass are essential. Rock climbing opportunities are excellent on vast granite slabs and peaks.

Historic gold mining structures and relics add interest for visitors in various parts of the wilderness.  Gold panning continues to be good for the experienced amateur.

Granite Peak is a good destination for views as well as Silligo peak, on the Four Lakes Loop. Trinity Lake is visible to the south, and much of the rest of the area is visible as well. Remnants of the old lookout station remain.

Private land
Purchases by the Wilderness Land Trust have reduced this acreage by more than 40 percent.

References

External links
Trinity Alps Wilderness - Wilderness Connect
The Wilderness Land Trust
The Trinity Alps - Celebrating 30 years of wilderness designation

Wilderness areas of California
Klamath Mountains
Protected areas of Humboldt County, California
Protected areas of Siskiyou County, California
Protected areas of Trinity County, California
Klamath National Forest
Shasta-Trinity National Forest
Six Rivers National Forest
Protected areas established in 1984
1984 establishments in California